A combination plate can refer to several things, including:
 A combination meal
 A type of tableware
 A type of dental dentures
 Crystals and/or minerals that have formed in a combination, 
 A printing plate that has both line drawings and halftones
 A combination wall plate molded with a variety of ports for various electrical items, such as switches and plugs.

Meal

A combination plate may refer to a meal or plate with a combination of foods.

Tableware
A combination plate may refer to a type of tableware plate, dish or platter that is designed with separate compartments for foods to be placed in. This has also been referred to as a compartment plate and a partition plate. Combination plate meals are sometimes served on this type of plate. In Nepal, this type of plate is called a thaali, and is typically made of metal. In Nepalese cuisine, the dish daal bhaat is often served on a thaali. In the United States, compartment plates have been used to serve table d'hôte dinners. In the United States, combination plates have been used as a part of U.S. army mess kits.

Dentures
In dentistry, the term has referred to dentures prepared and cast with a combination of materials, such as gold and rubber, plastic and metallic material, and gold and porcelain.

Gemology
In gemology, a combination plate refers to two or more crystals and/or minerals that have formed in a combination.

Printing
In printing and graphic arts, a printing plate that has "both halftones and line drawings, often combined"

Wall plate

A combination plate can refer to a combination wall plate that has a combination of ports for switches, plugs, etc.

See also

 Banchan
 Blue-plate special
 Foodpairing
 Meat and three
 Plate lunch

References

Further reading

 
 
 

Kitchenware
Restaurant terminology
American cuisine
Serving and dining
Printing
Food combinations